Anton Feldmann (born 20 September 1948) is a Swiss middle-distance runner. He competed in the men's 3000 metres steeplechase at the 1972 Summer Olympics.

References

External links
 

1948 births
Living people
Athletes (track and field) at the 1972 Summer Olympics
Swiss male middle-distance runners
Swiss male steeplechase runners
Olympic athletes of Switzerland
Place of birth missing (living people)